John Grimes (December 18, 1852 – July 26, 1922) was an Irish-born prelate of the Roman Catholic Church. He served as Bishop of Syracuse from 1912 until his death in 1922.

Biography

Early life 
John Grimes was born in County Limerick to John and Bridget (née Hammon) Grimes. He was educated at both a national school and a Jesuit college in Ireland before going to Canada, where he enrolled at the College of Saint-Hyacinthe in 1874.

Attached to the Diocese of Albany, New York, in the United States, he was sent by Bishop Francis McNierney to study at the Grand Seminary of Montreal in 1878.

Priesthood 
He was ordained to the priesthood in Albany by Bishop Francis McNeirny on February 19, 1882. He then served as a curate at St. Mary's Church in Syracuse until 1887, when he became pastor of St. Paul's Church in Whitesboro, New York. In 1890 he returned to St. Mary's as its pastor.

Coadjutor Bishop and Bishop of Syracuse 
On February 1, 1909, Grimes was appointed as coadjutor bishop of  the Diocese of Syracuse and Titular Bishop of Hermeria by Pope Pius X.   He received his episcopal consecration on May 16, 1909, from Archbishop John Farley, with Bishops Patrick Ludden and Thomas Burke serving as co-consecrators. 

Upon the death of Bishop Ludden, Grimes automatically succeeded him as the second bishop of Syracuse on August 6, 1912. 

John Grimes died on July 26, 1922, at age 69. The funeral was presided over by Patrick Joseph Hayes, Archbishop of New York, during which city courts adjourned for one hour.

A Catholic high school, Bishop Grimes Junior/Senior High School in East Syracuse, New York, was named in 1960 after him.

References

External links

1852 births
1922 deaths
19th-century Irish Roman Catholic priests
Clergy from County Limerick
Irish emigrants to the United States (before 1923)
20th-century Roman Catholic bishops in the United States
Roman Catholic bishops of Syracuse
Place of death missing
19th-century American Roman Catholic priests